Robert Lawler (born March 20, 1982) is an American professional mixed martial artist who has been competing since 2001. He is a former UFC Welterweight Champion, former EliteXC Middleweight Champion, and has formerly competed in Strikeforce, PRIDE, and the IFL. Known for his aggressive fighting style, Lawler is the only fighter to have won three consecutive "Fight of the Year" awards from Sherdog and MMA Fighting, for his bouts against Johny Hendricks (at UFC 171, in 2014), Rory MacDonald (at UFC 189, in 2015), and Carlos Condit (at UFC 195, in 2016).

Early life and education
Lawler was born in San Diego, California. He moved to Bettendorf, Iowa at the age of ten to live with his father, who served in the Marines. Lawler began training in taekwondo at the age of eight, picking up karate two years later. Lawler attended Bettendorf High School where he received All-State honors in wrestling and football. Lawler was taken under the wing of Pat Miletich when he was 16 years old and began training with Miletich Fighting Systems as soon as he graduated in 2000.

Mixed martial arts career

Early career
Lawler made his professional debut in 2001 and won his first four career fights all by TKO/KO.

Ultimate Fighting Championship
Lawler made his UFC debut at UFC 37 against veteran Aaron Riley. Lawler won the bout via unanimous decision. Lawler fought again in the next month against Steve Berger at UFC 37.5 and won via TKO. In his next fight, Lawler faced another veteran, Tiki Ghosn at UFC 40 and won in a highlight-reel knockout. Lawler then fought against Pete Spratt at UFC 42 and lost after he submitted due to a knee injury. Lawler came back to get a win over fellow boxing and wrestling specialist Chris Lytle via unanimous decision at UFC 45.

In his next UFC bout, Lawler faced former WEC Welterweight Champion and future longtime Strikeforce Welterweight Champion Nick Diaz at UFC 47. Lawler was handed the first of only two knockout losses of his career to date in the second round. Lawler then lost again at UFC 50 against the late Evan Tanner, who would win the UFC Middleweight Championship in his next fight.

Post-UFC
Lawler then fought at SuperBrawl in Hawaii, defeating Falaniko Vitale via knockout to become the SuperBrawl Middleweight Champion. Lawler then made his debut for King of the Cage, being scheduled to fight Jeremy Brown, and won via armbar submission.

Lawler then faced Falaniko Vitale again, this time for the ICON Sport Middleweight Championship, and won again in the rematch by knockout, becoming the ICON Sport Middleweight Champion.

In his next bout and first title defense, Lawler lost to Jason "Mayhem" Miller via arm-triangle choke submission.

Lawler then made his PRIDE debut in Las Vegas, Nevada against Joey Villasenor at PRIDE 32 and won via knockout.

In his next fight, Lawler made his IFL debut in Atlanta, Georgia against Eduardo Pamplona and won via TKO.

On March 31, 2007, he fought Frank Trigg for the ICON Sport Middleweight Championship and won by KO in the fourth round, becoming the ICON Sport Middleweight Champion a second time. On September 15, 2007, he fought PRIDE Fighting Championships veteran Murilo Rua for the EliteXC Middleweight Championship and won by TKO in the third round due to punches.

Lawler was scheduled to fight Kala Hose for the ICON Sport Middleweight Championship on December 15, 2007, in Honolulu, Hawaii, Lawler however pulled out of the fight due to an injury. After pulling out again due to the same circumstances,
ICON Sport stripped Lawler of the middleweight title on February 9, 2008, for failing to defend the title.

Lawler defended his EliteXC Middleweight Championship against Scott Smith at EliteXC: Primetime on May 31, 2008, at the Prudential Center in Newark, New Jersey, which ended in a no contest after Smith caught an accidental finger in the eye from Lawler.

On July 26, 2008, Lawler and Scott Smith had their rematch at EliteXC: Unfinished Business. Lawler defeated Smith by TKO in the second round.

Strikeforce
After defeating Scott Smith, Lawler's employers, EliteXC, announced that they would be shutting down and filing for bankruptcy. Lawler's contract was picked up by Strikeforce with his first bout under the Strikeforce banner on June 6, 2009, against Jake Shields. The bout was fought at a catchweight of 182 lb. Lawler lost via submission due to a guillotine choke at 2:02 of the first round.

Lawler faced K-1 veteran Melvin Manhoef on January 30, 2010 at Strikeforce: Miami. During the bout, Lawler suffered significant damage to his leg which Manhoef inflicted using leg kicks. In dramatic fashion, Lawler came back to win by knockout late in the first round with an overhand right.

Lawler was expected to face Jason Miller on June 16, 2010, at Strikeforce: Los Angeles but Lawler instead faced former Strikeforce Light Heavyweight Champion Renato Sobral in a 195 lbs. Catchweight bout. Lawler had two unsuccessful attempts to meet the 195 lbs mark at the Strikeforce: Los Angeles Weigh-Ins, but was finally booked for the fight weighing 195.5 pounds, after stepping on the scale for the third time. Sobral defeated Lawler via unanimous decision. Sobral utilized his reach advantage and grappling expertise to defeat the much smaller Lawler.

Lawler fought Olympic Games silver medalist Matt Lindland at Strikeforce: Henderson vs. Babalu II on December 4, 2010. He defeated Lindland fifty seconds into the first round via KO.

Lawler faced Strikeforce Middleweight Champion Ronaldo Souza on January 29, 2011 at Strikeforce: Diaz vs. Cyborg. Lawler rocked Souza in the first round but ended up losing the fight via submission in the third round.

Lawler returned and faced Tim Kennedy at Strikeforce: Fedor vs. Henderson. He lost the fight via unanimous decision, being dominantly controlled throughout the fight on the floor by Kennedy.

Lawler got back on track with a highlight reel first-round TKO victory due to a flying knee over rising prospect Adlan Amagov at Strikeforce: Rockhold vs. Jardine.

Lawler next faced Lorenz Larkin at Strikeforce: Rockhold vs. Kennedy on July 14, 2012. He lost the fight via unanimous decision, despite rocking Larkin early in the first round with a short right hook. He left Miletich Fighting Systems after this loss and joined Florida-based gym American Top Team.

Return to UFC
Lawler returned to the Welterweight division and faced Josh Koscheck on February 23, 2013 at UFC 157. He won via first-round TKO. Koscheck visibly protested the stoppage, but replay footage showed he was not defending himself in a dangerous position, as Lawler landed repeated blows. The finish earned him the Knockout of the Night bonus.

Lawler was expected to face former Strikeforce Welterweight Champion Tarec Saffiedine on July 27, 2013 at UFC on Fox 8. However, Saffiedine was forced out of the bout with an injury and was replaced by Siyar Bahadurzada. Then on July 11, it was announced that Bahadurzada also pulled out of the bout and was replaced by Bobby Voelker. Lawler won the fight via knockout in the second round.

Lawler next faced Rory MacDonald at UFC 167. He won the fight via split decision.

On December 13, 2013 news came that Georges St-Pierre would be taking an indefinite break from MMA and vacate the UFC Welterweight Championship. Following the announcement, Dana White announced that Lawler would face Johny Hendricks on March 15, 2014 at UFC 171 for the vacated title. Lawler lost the close back-and-forth bout via unanimous decision. Despite the loss, the fight earned Lawler his first Fight of the Night bonus award.

Returning quickly to the cage, Lawler replaced an injured Tarec Saffiedine and fought Jake Ellenberger at UFC 173 on May 24, 2014. He won the fight via TKO in the third round due to a combination of a knee and punches.

Lawler faced Matt Brown in a 5-round Welterweight title eliminator bout on July 26, 2014 at UFC on Fox 12. He won the fight via unanimous decision. The win also earned him a Fight of the Night bonus award.

UFC Welterweight Champion
Lawler fought a rematch with Johny Hendricks for the UFC Welterweight Championship at UFC 181 on December 6, 2014. He won the fight, and the title, via split decision.

A rematch with Rory MacDonald took place on July 11, 2015 at UFC 189. Lawler retained his title in the fifth round via TKO. The back and forth action earned both participants Fight of the Night honors. The fight was considered an instant classic by fans and media alike with UFC President Dana White hailing it as one of the best welterweight fights in the promotion's history. The fight was chosen as the Sherdog Fight of the Year for 2015. The fight has since been acclaimed as one of the greatest in the history of mixed martial arts, voted the best fight in the history of the UFC in an ESPN poll in 2017.

Lawler was expected to face Carlos Condit on November 15, 2015 at UFC 193. However, the bout was scrapped from the event after Lawler suffered a thumb injury. The fight was rescheduled as the headliner at UFC 195 on January 2, 2016. Lawler defended his title, and defeated Condit via split decision in a very close fight. The bout also earned Lawler his fourth Fight of the Night bonus award.

Lawler faced Tyron Woodley on July 30, 2016 in the main event at UFC 201. He lost the fight via knockout early in the first round, thus losing the title.

Post-championship
Lawler was briefly linked to a bout with Donald Cerrone on November 12, 2016 at UFC 205. However, just a few days after the announcement, it was revealed that Lawler had declined the fight to allow more recovery time from his last defeat. He was replaced by The Ultimate Fighter: Team Jones vs. Team Sonnen middleweight winner Kelvin Gastelum.

Lawler was expected to face Cerrone on July 8, 2017 at UFC 213. However, reports began to circulate on June 28 that Cerrone had sustained a minor injury and that the pairing would be left intact, but is expected to take place three weeks later at UFC 214. UFC President Dana White confirmed later that same day that Cerrone in fact had a staph infection and a pulled groin.

Lawler faced Cerrone on July 29, 2017 at UFC 214. He won the fight via unanimous decision. In the post fight interview, Lawler dedicated his win to Matt Hughes, who was involved in a truck accident in June 2017 and was then recovering from serious injuries.

Lawler faced Rafael Dos Anjos on December 16, 2017 in the main event at UFC on Fox: Lawler vs. dos Anjos. He lost the fight by unanimous decision, and he suffered from a torn ACL from the fight which would prevent him from fighting in 2018.

Lawler faced UFC newcomer Ben Askren on March 2, 2019, at UFC 235. Although Lawler looked to have the upper hand on Askren early on in the fight, he eventually lost the fight due to a bulldog choke. The ending of the fight was controversial because referee Herb Dean stopped the fight thinking that Lawler had passed out when this may not have been the case; Lawler's arm appeared to go limp indicating he had passed out, however, while Dean was checking to see if he was out he appeared to signal a thumbs up and jumped up fully conscious straight after the stoppage. Despite that, Nevada State Athletic Commission director Bob Bennett was in full support of Dean's decision to stop the fight.

A rematch with Tyron Woodley was expected to take place on June 29, 2019 at UFC on ESPN 3. On May 16, 2019 it was reported that Woodley suffered a hand injury and was pulled from the fight. The bout was ultimately scrapped.

Lawler faced Colby Covington on August 3, 2019 at UFC on ESPN 5. He lost the bout via unanimous decision.

Lawler was scheduled to face Santiago Ponzinibbio on December 14, 2019 at UFC 245. However, on October 12, 2019, it was revealed that Ponzinibbio had pulled out of the fight due to a staph infection.

Lawler faced Neil Magny, replacing Geoff Neal, on August 29, 2020 at UFC Fight Night 175. He lost the fight via unanimous decision.

Lawler was expected to face  Mike Perry on November 21, 2020, at UFC 255. However, due to injuries, Lawler pulled out of the bout.

Lawler faced returning veteran Nick Diaz in a rematch on September 25, 2021 at UFC 266. The bout was contested at middleweight and was a special non-title, non-main event five round fight. In the third round, Lawler knocked down Diaz, who did not respond to the referee's instruction to return to his feet. As a result Lawler was awarded the win by TKO.

Lawler faced Bryan Barberena on July 2, 2022, at UFC 276. He lost the back-and-forth bout by TKO in the second round. This fight earned him a Fight of the Night award.

Lawler was scheduled to face Santiago Ponzinibbio on December 10, 2022, at UFC 282.  However, the week of the event, Lawler was forced to withdraw due to an undisclosed injury.

Personal life
Lawler also has an elder brother. He is married to Marcia Suzanne Lawler (née Fritz) and has a son.

Championships and accomplishments

Mixed martial arts
Ultimate Fighting Championship
UFC Welterweight Championship (One time)
Two successful title defenses
Fight of the Night (Five times) 
Knockout of the Night (One time) 
Fighter of the Year (2014, 2015)
Fight of the Year (2014) vs. Johny Hendricks at UFC 171
Fight of the Year (2015) vs. Rory MacDonald at UFC 189
Elite Xtreme Combat
EliteXC Middleweight Championship (One time; Last)
ICON Sport
ICON Sport Middleweight Championship (Two times)
Superbrawl
Superbrawl Middleweight Championship (One time; Last)
World MMA Awards
2014 Fighter of the Year
2015 Fight of the Year vs. Rory MacDonald at UFC 189
Sherdog
2010 Knockout of the Year vs. Melvin Manhoef on January 30
2010 All-Violence Second Team
2014 All-Violence First Team
2015 All-Violence First Team
2013 Comeback Fighter of the Year
2014 Fighter of the Year
2014 Fight of the Year vs. Johny Hendricks at UFC 171
2015 Fight of the Year vs. Rory MacDonald at UFC 189
2016 Fight of the Year vs. Carlos Condit at UFC 195
Inside MMA
2013 Breakthrough Fighter of the Year Bazzie Award
MMA Fighting
2014 Fighter of the Year
2014 Fight of the Year vs. Johny Hendricks at UFC 171
2015 Fight of the Year vs. Rory MacDonald at UFC 189
2016 Fight of the Year vs. Carlos Condit at UFC 195
MMAJunkie.com
2014 March Fight of the Month vs. Johny Hendricks
2015 July Fight of the Month vs. Rory MacDonald
2015 Fight of the Year vs. Rory MacDonald at UFC 189
Bleacher Report
2014 Fighter of the Year
2014 Fight of the Year vs. Johny Hendricks at UFC 171
2015 Fight of the Year vs. Rory MacDonald at UFC 189
Wrestling Observer Newsletter awards
2014 MMA Match of the Year vs. Johny Hendricks at UFC 171
2015 MMA Match of the Year vs. Rory Macdonald at UFC 189
2016 MMA Match of the Year vs. Carlos Condit at UFC 195

Mixed martial arts record 

|-
|Loss
|align=center|29–16 (1)
|Bryan Barberena
|TKO (punches)
|UFC 276
| 
|align=center|2
|align=center|4:47
|Las Vegas, Nevada, United States
|
|-
|Win
|align=center|29–15 (1)
|Nick Diaz
|TKO (retirement)
|UFC 266
|
|align=center|3
|align=center|0:44
|Las Vegas, Nevada, United States
|
|-
|Loss
|align=center|28–15 (1)
|Neil Magny
|Decision (unanimous)
|UFC Fight Night: Smith vs. Rakić
|
|align=center|3
|align=center|5:00
|Las Vegas, Nevada, United States
|
|-
|Loss
|align=center|28–14 (1)
|Colby Covington
|Decision (unanimous)
|UFC on ESPN: Covington vs. Lawler
|
|align=center|5
|align=center|5:00
|Newark, New Jersey, United States
|
|-
|Loss
|align=center|28–13 (1)
|Ben Askren
|Technical Submission (bulldog choke)
|UFC 235 
|
|align=center|1
|align=center|3:20
|Las Vegas, Nevada, United States
|
|-
|Loss
|align=center|28–12 (1)
|Rafael dos Anjos
|Decision (unanimous)
|UFC on Fox: Lawler vs. dos Anjos 
|
|align=center|5
|align=center|5:00
|Winnipeg, Manitoba, Canada
|
|-
|Win
|align=center|28–11 (1)
|Donald Cerrone
|Decision (unanimous)
|UFC 214
|
|align=center|3
|align=center|5:00
|Anaheim, California, United States
|
|-
|Loss
|align=center|27–11 (1)
|Tyron Woodley
|KO (punches)
|UFC 201 
|
|align=center|1
|align=center|2:12
|Atlanta, Georgia, United States
|
|-
| Win
|align=center|27–10 (1)
|Carlos Condit
|Decision (split)
|UFC 195 
|
|align=center|5
|align=center|5:00
|Las Vegas, Nevada, United States
|
|-
|Win
|align=center|26–10 (1)
|Rory MacDonald
|TKO (punches)
|UFC 189
|
|align=center|5
|align=center|1:00
|Las Vegas, Nevada, United States
|
|-
| Win
|align=center|25–10 (1)
|Johny Hendricks
|Decision (split)
|UFC 181
|
|align=center|5
|align=center|5:00 
|Las Vegas, Nevada, United States
|
|-
| Win
| align=center| 24–10 (1)
| Matt Brown
| Decision (unanimous)
| UFC on Fox: Lawler vs. Brown
| 
| align=center|5
| align=center|5:00
| San Jose, California, United States
| 
|-
| Win
| align=center| 23–10 (1)
| Jake Ellenberger
| TKO (knee and punches)
| UFC 173
| 
| align=center|3
| align=center|3:06
| Las Vegas, Nevada, United States
|
|-
| Loss
| align=center| 22–10 (1)
| Johny Hendricks
| Decision (unanimous)
| UFC 171
| 
| align=center|5
| align=center|5:00
| Dallas, Texas, United States
| 
|-
| Win
| align=center| 22–9 (1)
| Rory MacDonald
| Decision (split)
| UFC 167
| 
| align=center| 3
| align=center| 5:00
| Las Vegas, Nevada, United States
| 
|-
| Win
| align=center| 21–9 (1)
| Bobby Voelker
| KO (head kick and punch)
| UFC on Fox: Johnson vs. Moraga
| 
| align=center| 2
| align=center| 0:24
| Seattle, Washington, United States
| 
|-
| Win
| align=center| 20–9 (1)
| Josh Koscheck
| TKO (knee and punches)
| UFC 157
| 
| align=center| 1
| align=center| 3:57
| Anaheim, California, United States
| 
|-
| Loss
| align=center| 19–9 (1)
| Lorenz Larkin
| Decision (unanimous)
| Strikeforce: Rockhold vs. Kennedy
| 
| align=center| 3
| align=center| 5:00
| Portland, Oregon, United States
| 
|-
| Win
| align=center| 19–8 (1)
| Adlan Amagov
| TKO (flying knee and punches)
| Strikeforce: Rockhold vs. Jardine
| 
| align=center| 1
| align=center| 1:48
| Las Vegas, Nevada, United States
| 
|-
| Loss
| align=center| 18–8 (1)
| Tim Kennedy
| Decision (unanimous)
| Strikeforce: Fedor vs. Henderson
| 
| align=center| 3
| align=center| 5:00
| Hoffman Estates, Illinois, United States
| 
|-
| Loss
| align=center| 18–7 (1)
| Ronaldo Souza
| Submission (rear-naked choke)
| Strikeforce: Diaz vs. Cyborg
| 
| align=center| 3
| align=center| 2:00
| San Jose, California, United States
| 
|-
| Win
| align=center| 18–6 (1)
| Matt Lindland
| KO (punch)
| Strikeforce: Henderson vs. Babalu II
| 
| align=center| 1
| align=center| 0:50
| St. Louis, Missouri, United States
|
|-
| Loss
| align=center| 17–6 (1)
| Renato Sobral
| Decision (unanimous)
| Strikeforce: Los Angeles
| 
| align=center| 3
| align=center| 5:00
| Los Angeles, California, United States
| 
|-
| Win
| align=center| 17–5 (1)
| Melvin Manhoef
| KO (punch)
| Strikeforce: Miami
| 
| align=center| 1
| align=center| 3:33
| Sunrise, Florida, United States
|
|-
| Loss
| align=center| 16–5 (1)
| Jake Shields
| Submission (guillotine choke)
| Strikeforce: Lawler vs. Shields
| 
| align=center| 1
| align=center| 2:02
| St. Louis, Missouri, United States
| 
|-
| Win
| align=center| 16–4 (1)
| Scott Smith
| TKO (soccer kicks and punches)
| EliteXC: Unfinished Business
| 
| align=center| 2
| align=center| 2:35
| Stockton, California, United States
| 
|-
| NC
| align=center| 15–4 (1)
| Scott Smith
| NC (accidental eye poke)
| EliteXC: Primetime
| 
| align=center| 3
| align=center| 3:26
| Newark, New Jersey, United States
| 
|-
| Win
| align=center| 15–4
| Murilo Rua
| KO (punches)
| EliteXC: Uprising
| 
| align=center| 3
| align=center| 2:04
| Honolulu, Hawaii, United States
| 
|-
| Win
| align=center| 14–4
| Frank Trigg
| KO (punches)
| ICON Sport: Epic
| 
| align=center| 4
| align=center| 1:40
| Honolulu, Hawaii, United States
| 
|-
| Win
| align=center| 13–4
| Eduardo Pamplona
| TKO (punches)
| IFL: Atlanta
| 
| align=center| 3
| align=center| 1:36
| Atlanta, Georgia, United States
| 
|-
| Win
| align=center| 12–4
| Joey Villaseñor
| KO (flying knee)
| PRIDE 32
| 
| align=center| 1
| align=center| 0:22
| Las Vegas, Nevada, United States
| 
|-
| Loss
| align=center| 11–4
| Jason Miller
| Submission (arm-triangle choke)
| ICON Sport: Mayhem vs. Lawler
| 
| align=center| 3
| align=center| 2:50
| Honolulu, Hawaii, United States
| 
|-
| Win
| align=center| 11–3
| Falaniko Vitale
| KO (punches)
| ICON Sport: Lawler vs. Niko II
| 
| align=center| 1
| align=center| 3:38
| Honolulu, Hawaii, United States
| 
|-
| Win
| align=center| 10–3
| Jeremy Brown
| Submission (armbar)
| KOTC: Xtreme Edge
| 
| align=center| 1
| align=center| 2:48
| Indianapolis, Indiana, United States
| 
|-
| Win
| align=center| 9–3
| Falaniko Vitale
| KO (punches)
| SuperBrawl: Icon
| 
| align=center| 2
| align=center| 4:36
| Honolulu, Hawaii, United States
| 
|-
| Loss
| align=center| 8–3
| Evan Tanner
| Submission (triangle choke)
| UFC 50
| 
| align=center| 1
| align=center| 2:22
| Atlantic City, New Jersey, United States
| 
|-
| Loss
| align=center| 8–2
| Nick Diaz
| KO (punch)
| UFC 47
| 
| align=center| 2
| align=center| 1:31
| Las Vegas, Nevada, United States
| 
|-
| Win
| align=center| 8–1
| Chris Lytle
| Decision (unanimous)
| UFC 45
| 
| align=center| 3
| align=center| 5:00
| Uncasville, Connecticut, United States
| 
|-
| Loss
| align=center| 7–1
| Pete Spratt
| TKO (knee injury)
| UFC 42
| 
| align=center| 2
| align=center| 2:28
| Miami, Florida, United States
| 
|-
| Win
| align=center| 7–0
| Tiki Ghosn
| KO (punches)
| UFC 40
| 
| align=center| 1
| align=center| 1:29
| Las Vegas, Nevada, United States
| 
|-
| Win
| align=center| 6–0
| Steve Berger
| TKO (punches)
| UFC 37.5
| 
| align=center| 2
| align=center| 0:27
| Las Vegas, Nevada, United States
| 
|-
| Win
| align=center| 5–0
| Aaron Riley
| Decision (unanimous)
| UFC 37
| 
| align=center| 3
| align=center| 5:00
| Bossier City, Louisiana, United States
| 
|-
| Win
| align=center| 4–0
| Saburo Kawakatsu
| TKO (punches)
| Shogun 1
| 
| align=center| 1
| align=center| 4:49
| Honolulu, Hawaii, United States
| 
|-
| Win
| align=center| 3–0
| Marco Macera
| TKO (punches)
| Extreme Challenge 41
| 
| align=center| 1
| align=center| 1:19
| Davenport, Iowa, United States
| 
|-
| Win
| align=center| 2–0
| Landon Showalter
| KO (punches)
| IFC: Warriors Challenge 13
| 
| align=center| 1
| align=center| 0:14
| Fresno, California, United States
| 
|-
| Win
| align=center| 1–0
| John Reed
| TKO (punches)
| Extreme Challenge 39
| 
| align=center| 1
| align=center| 2:14
| Springfield, Illinois, United States
|

Pay-per-view bouts

See also

 List of current UFC fighters
 List of male mixed martial artists

References

External links
 
 

1982 births
Living people
American male karateka
American male taekwondo practitioners
Sportspeople from San Diego
American male mixed martial artists
Mixed martial artists from California
Mixed martial artists from Iowa
Middleweight mixed martial artists
Mixed martial artists utilizing taekwondo
Mixed martial artists utilizing karate
Mixed martial artists utilizing wrestling
People from Bettendorf, Iowa
People from Scott County, Iowa
Ultimate Fighting Championship champions
People from Coconut Creek, Florida
People from Parkland, Florida
Welterweight mixed martial artists
Ultimate Fighting Championship male fighters
Bettendorf High School alumni